Tanakorn Santanaprasit (Thai ธนากร สันทนาประสิทธิ์), is a Thai futsal Midfielder, and currently a member of  Thailand national futsal team.

He competed for Thailand at the 2008 FIFA Futsal World Cup finals in Brazil.

References

Tanakorn Santanaprasit
1979 births
Living people
Tanakorn Santanaprasit